Álvaro Fernández (born 7 April 1981) is a Spanish middle-distance runner. He competed in the men's 1500 metres at the 2004 Summer Olympics.

References

1981 births
Living people
Athletes (track and field) at the 2004 Summer Olympics
Spanish male middle-distance runners
Olympic athletes of Spain
Place of birth missing (living people)